What Every Woman Knows is a 1921 American silent comedy-drama film adapted form the play What Every Woman Knows by James Barrie. The play had premiered on Broadway in 1908 and was a  hit starring Maude Adams. A British silent film version had been made in 1917 and a later American talkie would be produced in 1934 with Helen Hayes. This silent film version was directed by William C. deMille continuing his forte at adapting literary and/or stage plays to the silent screen. The film stars Lois Wilson and Conrad Nagel. This version is now lost.

Plot
Based on a summary in a film publication, Maggie Wylie's (Wilson) father agrees to give John Shand $300 to help him secure his education and political ambitions on condition that Maggie have the option of marrying him within five years. By doing so the elder Wylie is giving the 27-year-old miss the chance for the romance she longs for and at the same time helping an ambitious young man. Shand agrees and within the allotted time is elected to Parliament. Maggie realizes that John does not love her, but he insists "a bargain is a bargain" and so they are married. John becomes very popular and is promised promotion through his excellent speeches, which are written mostly by Maggie although John takes credit. Eventually, he falls in love with Lady Sybil (Tucker) and, although heartbroken, Maggie diplomatically arranges for John and Sybil to be together. John's next speech is a failure, but Maggie arrives in time with a new one. Lady Sybil tells John that he bores her and leaves. Gradually John comes to see Maggie's true worth and there is a reconciliation.

Cast
Lois Wilson as Maggie Wylie
Conrad Nagel as John Shand
Charles Ogle as Alick Wylie
Fred Huntley as David Wylie
Guy Oliver as James Wylie
Winter Hall as Charles Venables
Lillian Tucker as Sybil Tenterden
Claire McDowell as Comtesse de la Briere
Robert Brower as Scot Lawyer

References

External links

1921 films
American silent feature films
American films based on plays
Films based on works by J. M. Barrie
Films directed by William C. deMille
Lost American films
American black-and-white films
Films set in London
American romantic comedy-drama films
1920s romantic comedy-drama films
1921 lost films
1924 comedy films
1924 films
1921 comedy films
1921 drama films
1924 drama films
Paramount Pictures films
1920s American films
1920s English-language films
Silent romantic comedy films
Silent romantic drama films
Silent American comedy-drama films